Love Is Not Sex is the debut album of American-born musician Tony Dawson-Harrison, AKA "Captain Hollywood". Dawson-Harrison was exposed to eurodance music during his military service in 80's West Germany. It was released on March 8, 1993.

The album peaked at No. 9 on the German Albums Chart, and has sold around nearly 7 million copies worldwide as of 2018.

Track listing

Charts

Production
Design [Cover] – Design Hoch Drei
Guitar – DiKo Kociemba 
Management – Susanne Foecker 
Other [Hair] – Joe Barber 
Photography – Esser & Strauß 
Producer, Recorded By, Mastered By – Cyborg, DMP GmbH
Recorded at DMP Studios
Publishing – Edition "DMP" / "Get Into Magic" / ICM / Warner Chappell
Marketing – Intercord Ton GmbH, Licensee

References

External links
 http://www.pandora.com/captain-hollywood-project/love-is-not-sex

1993 debut albums
Captain Hollywood Project albums